FYU may refer to:
 Fooyin University, in Taiwan
 Fort Yukon Airport, in Alaska, United States